Wolverhampton power station, also known as Commercial Road power station, supplied electricity to the Borough of Wolverhampton, England and the surrounding area from 1895 to 1976. It was redeveloped in several stages to meet growing demand for electricity: including the addition of new plant in 1902 to 1908, 1925 and 1942. The power station was initially owned and operated by Wolverhampton Corporation, but was transferred to the West Midlands Joint Electricity Authority in 1928. The British Electricity Authority assumed ownership at nationalisation in 1948. Wolverhampton power station was decommissioned in 1976.

History
In 1883 Wolverhampton Corporation applied for a provisional order under the Electric Lighting Acts to generate and supply electricity to the town. This was granted by the Board of Trade, however, no construction work was undertaken and a further provisional order was obtained in 1890. The power station was built in Commercial Road (52°34'54"N 2°06'54"W ) and was adjacent to the Wolverhampton Level canal for the delivery of coal. It first supplied electricity on 30 January 1895.

Equipment specification

Original plant 1895
The original 1895 plant at Wolverhampton power station comprised Marshall's horizontal compound engines coupled by ropes to Electric Construction Company and Parker dynamos, together with a Belliss engine coupled directly to a Parker dynamo. In 1898 the generating capacity was 632 kW and the maximum load on the system was 318 kW.

New plant 1902–04
New plant was installed from 1902, partly to supply the local tramway system. By 1908 the capacity was 6 MW there were two Babcock & Wilcox 20,000 lb/h (2.52 kg/s) boilers, two 1 MW turbo-alternators. By 1913 there was 3 MW of direct current generating plant and 4 MW of alternating current generation.

In 1904 a refuse destructor was built in Crown Street, this generated steam to drive two 125 kW generators. Further plant was added to the destructor plant bringing the generating capacity up to 750 kW (1913) and 1 MW (1921). This comprised one 500 kW AC turbine and one 500 kW DC turbine.

Plant in 1923
By 1923 the generating plant comprised:

 Coal-fired boilers generating up to 360,000 lb/h (45.4 kg/s) of steam, which was supplied:
 Generators:
 1 × 1,000 kW steam turbo-alternator
 1 × 2,000 kW steam turbo-alternator
 1 × 4,000 kW steam turbo-alternator
 3 × 5,000 kW steam turbo-alternators

These machines gave a total generating capacity of 22 MW of alternating current.

In addition the adjacent refuse destructor plant had a 500 kW turbine generating direct current.

Electricity was supplied to consumers at:

 3-phase, 50 Hz AC at 400 & 230 Volts
 Direct current at 440 & 220 Volts

In 1925 the DC generators were scrapped and two 7.5 MW turbo-alternators were commissioned. This brought the capacity of the station to 23 MW.

Plant in 1942
New plant was commissioned in 1942, comprising:

 Boilers:
 4 × Thompson La Mont stoker fired boilers each capable of producing 120,000 lb/h (15.1 kg/s), steam conditions 440 psi and 850 °F (30.3 bar, 454 °C),which supplied steam to:
 1 × 30 MW Brush-Ljungstrom turbo-alternator, generating electricity at 6.6 kV.
 Condenser cooling water was cooled in a single Hennibique reinforced concrete cooling tower with a capacity of 1.5 million gallons per hour (1.89 m3/s).

Operations
Operational data for the station was as follows.

In 1898 maximum electricity demand was 318 kW. There were 208 customers supplied with a total of 211,777 kWh of electricity plus 79,438 kWh for public lamps. The revenue from the sales of current was £6,139 offset by generating costs of £2,211.

Operating data 1921–23
The operating data for the period 1921–23 was:

Ownership of Wolverhampton power station was transferred to the West Midlands Joint Electricity Authority in 1928.

Operating data 1934–6
The station capacity and output in the mid-1930s was:

Operating data 1946
Wolverhampton power station operating data in 1946 was:

The British electricity supply industry was nationalised in 1948 under the provisions of the Electricity Act 1947 (10 & 11 Geo. 6 c. 54). The Wolverhampton electricity undertaking and the West Midlands Joint Electricity Authority were abolished. Ownership of Wolverhampton power station was vested in the British Electricity Authority, and subsequently the Central Electricity Authority and the Central Electricity Generating Board (CEGB). At the same time the electricity distribution and sales responsibilities of the Wolverhampton electricity undertaking were transferred to the Midlands Electricity Board (MEB).

Operating data 1954–72
Operating data for the period 1954–72 was:

The electricity output in GWh of the station was as shown. Wolverhampton was an electricity supply district covering 106 square miles (275 km2) and a population of 191,500. It encompassed the County Borough of Wolverhampton, and parts of the districts of Tettenhall, Cannock, Seisdon, Shifnal and Bridgnorth. The number of consumers and electricity sold was:

Closure and reuse
Wolverhampton power station was decommissioned on 25 October 1976. The main buildings have been adapted to commercial use.

See also
 Timeline of the UK electricity supply industry
 List of power stations in England

References

Coal-fired power stations in England
Demolished power stations in the United Kingdom
Former power stations in England
Buildings and structures in Wolverhampton